The Global Cultural Districts Network (GCDN) is a federation of global centers of arts and culture. Its members represent cities, cultural districts, and cultural institutions from around the world, including Australia, the United Kingdom, Canada, the United States, China, and Singapore.[14]

History
GCDN was founded in 2013 by Adrian Ellis, and established by AEA Consulting, the New Cities Foundation, and the Dallas Arts District. Beatrice Pembroke was appointed as Director in March 2018 and Adrian Ellis is chair.

The network's formation was stimulated by a series of conversations among cultural leaders, who were aware that, though forums for cultural institutions to meet and discuss common issues did exist, there were none for those responsible for cultural districts.

Members
GCDN's 50+ members represent cities, cultural districts, cultural institutions, non-profits, foundations, and private initiatives from around the world, including Australia, the UK, Canada, the US, Dubai, China, and Singapore.

Members
GCDN's current members include:

Abu Dhabi Department of Culture & Tourism – Abu Dhabi, UAE
Adelaide Festival Centre – Adelaide, Australia
Alserkal Avenue – Dubai, United Arab Emirates
Arizona Arts, University of Arizona – Tucson, USA
Auckland Live – Auckland, New Zealand
Better Bankside – London, UK
Brooklyn Cultural District (Brooklyn Academy of Music/Downtown Brooklyn Partnership/Downtown Brooklyn Arts Alliance) – New York City, USA
Canberra Theatre Centre – Canberra, Australia
City of Providence Art, Culture + Tourism Dept. – Providence, USA
Creative Estuary - Thames Estuary, UK
Culture Mile (Barbican Centre/Museum of London/City of London Corporation) – London, UK
Dallas Arts District – Dallas, USA
East Bank at Queen Elizabeth Olympic Park – London, UK
Exhibition Road Cultural Group (Discover South Kensington) – London, UK 
Goldsmiths, University of London – London, UK 
Harbourfront Centre – Toronto, Canada
HOTA, Home of the Arts – Surfers Paradise, Australia
Kingston Creative – Kingston, Jamaica
LAC Lugano Arte e Cultura – Lugano, Switzerland
Melbourne Arts Precinct (Arts Centre Melbourne/Melbourne Recital Centre) – Melbourne, Australia
MiSK Foundation – Kingdom of Saudi Arabia
MuseumsQuartier Wien – Vienna, Austria
National Heritage Board – Singapore, Singapore
Navy Pier, Inc. – Chicago, USA
Newark Museum of Art (NMOA) – Newark, New Jersey, USA
New Jersey Performing Arts Center (NJPAC) – Newark, NJ, USA
New World Symphony, America's Orchestral Academy – Miami Beach, USA
Olympic Foundation for Culture and Heritage – Lausanne, Switzerland
Onassis Foundation – Athens, Greece
Parnell Square Cultural Quarter, Temple Bar – Dublin, Ireland
Perth Theatre Trust – Perth, Australia
Pittsburgh Cultural Trust – Pittsburgh, USA
Quartier de la Création – Nantes, France
Quartier des Spectacles Partnership – Montreal, Canada 
RAB/BKO – Brussels, Belgium
Sharjah Museums Authority – Sharjah, UAE
Southbank Centre – London, UK
The Bentway Conservancy – Toronto, Canada
The Kuwait National Cultural District - Kuwait City, Kuwait
The Lowry/Salford Quays – Salford, UK
The Masswascut Collaborative – Providence, USA
The Music Center – Los Angeles, USA
Theater District Houston – Houston, USA
Times Square Alliance – New York, USA
West Kowloon Cultural District Authority – Hong Kong, China

Affiliate Members 
GCDN affiliate members are organizations and individuals who share a professional interest in contributing to the governance and operation of international cultural districts.

GCDN's affiliate members include:

BuroHappold – Bath, UK
Cistri, Singapore & Hong Kong – Urbis, Australia – Singapore, Hong Kong, Australia
DesignSingapore Council – Singapore
Grimshaw – New York, USA
Jason Bruges Studio – London, UK
wHY – Los Angeles & New York, USA

Convenings 
GCDN members are invited to regular convenings to share emerging best practices, hear expert panels, and discuss the place of cultural precincts and complexes in urban policy, economic development, and related areas of public policy such as technology, travel and tourism.

Past GCDN meetings include:

GCDN Annual Convening, Singapore – 2019 
GCDN Annual Convening, Dubai – 2018 
GCDN North American Regional Convening, Providence, Rhode Island – 2017 
GCDN Annual Convening, Barcelona, Spain – 2017 
GCDN Annual Convening, Brooklyn, New York – 2016
GCDN Annual Convening, London, UK – 2015 
New Cities Summit, Jakarta, Indonesia – 2015.
GCDN Members Convening, Montreal, Canada – 2015.
New Cities Summit, Dallas, Texas – 2014.

Research
GCDN regularly commissions and publishes academic research. Some of the network's publications include:

The Social Impact of Cultural Districts (2019) – A study and report commissioned by the Global Cultural Districts Network (GCDN) and written by Professor Geoffrey Crossick.
Governance Models of Cultural Districts (2018) – Research co-commissioned with the University of the Arts London and conducted by James Doeser and Anna Marazuela Kim.
Beyond Concrete Barriers: Innovation in Urban Furniture and Security in Public Space (2018) – Research initiated by the Quartier des Spectacles Partnership  and conducted by Jon Coaffee.
Cultural Infrastructure Index (2016-2019) – Annual survey seeking to measure investment in capital projects in the cultural sector.
Branding Cultural Districts and Destinations (2017) – Research co-commissioned with Future Places and directed by Juan Carlos Belloso.

References

External links
Official site

International cultural organizations